Mullhyttan is a locality situated in Lekeberg Municipality, Örebro County, Sweden with 503 inhabitants in 2010.

References 

Populated places in Örebro County
Populated places in Lekeberg Municipality